Robin Goldwasser (born August 14, 1966) is an American singer and playwright. She is a graduate of Sarah Lawrence College. She is the co-writer of the musical People Are Wrong! with Julia Greenberg. She has a character in the play, as does the producer, her husband, John Flansburgh of They Might Be Giants. The musical opened at the Vineyard Theater in New York in November 2004, starring Robin, John Flansburgh, Erin Hill, David Driver, and Maggie Moore.

Robin has sung on They Might Be Giants and Mono Puff tracks, including the Austin Powers: The Spy Who Shagged Me song, "Doctor Evil", "The Poisonousness" and "Electric Car", and has toured with both bands. She also sings on the People Are Wrong! CD.

She was in a band called the Last Car from 2005-2007, whose Mr. T-themed songs have appeared on the TMBG Podcast.

Her voice is prominently featured in the audiobook editions of John Hodgman's books of fake trivia, speaking the titles of chapters and sub-sections, and also the phrase "Power Move!" before each of Hodgman's examples of same.

References

American women singers
American women dramatists and playwrights
Living people
Place of birth missing (living people)
Sarah Lawrence College alumni
They Might Be Giants
1966 births